Janna Taylor (born September 9, 1948) was the Speaker pro Tempore for the Montana House of Representatives in 2011.

She was a Republican for District 11, which represents the Dayton area. She has served in the House from the 2005 session to the 2011 session. In 2012 she was ineligible to run for re-election due to Montana's term limits.

Taylor served as a Majority Whip in the Montana Senate for the 63rd Legislative Assembly. She was succeeded by Albert Olszewski for the 65th session.

Born in Minneapolis, Minnesota, Taylor received her bachelor's degree from the University of Minnesota. Taylor was a homemaker and rancher.

See also 
 Montana House of Representatives, District 11

References

Living people
1948 births
Republican Party Montana state senators
Republican Party members of the Montana House of Representatives
University of Minnesota alumni
Women state legislators in Montana
Politicians from Minneapolis
People from Lake County, Montana
Ranchers from Montana
21st-century American politicians
21st-century American women politicians